OTU domain-containing protein 4 is a protein that in humans is encoded by the OTUD4 gene.

Two alternatively spliced transcript variants encoding distinct isoforms have been found for this gene. The smaller protein isoform encoded by the shorter transcript variant is found only in HIV-1 infected cells.

References

Further reading